Irene Awuor Ogutu (born 14 June 1987) is a Kenyan footballer who plays as a defender. She has been a member of the Kenya women's national team.

International career
Ogutu played for Kenya at the 2016 Africa Women Cup of Nations.

See also
List of Kenya women's international footballers

References

1987 births
Living people
People from Nyanza Province
Kenyan women's footballers
Women's association football defenders
Kenya women's international footballers